Judit Rolo Marichal (born 30 October 1990) is a Spanish Paralympic swimmer who competes in international level events.

References

1990 births
Living people
Sportspeople from the Province of Santa Cruz de Tenerife
Paralympic swimmers of Spain
Spanish female butterfly swimmers
Spanish female medley swimmers
Swimmers at the 2016 Summer Paralympics
Medalists at the World Para Swimming Championships
Medalists at the World Para Swimming European Championships
S7-classified Paralympic swimmers
People from San Cristóbal de La Laguna